Shreeram Shankar Abhyankar (22 July 1930 – 2 November 2012)  was an Indian American mathematician known for his contributions to algebraic geometry. He, at the time of his death, held the Marshall Distinguished Professor of Mathematics Chair at Purdue University, and was also a professor of computer science and industrial engineering. He is known for Abhyankar's conjecture of finite group theory.

His latest research was in the area of computational and algorithmic algebraic geometry.

Career
Abhyankar was born in a Chitpavan Brahmin family in Ujjain, Madhya Pradesh, India. He earned his B.Sc. from Royal Institute of Science of University of Mumbai in 1951, his M.A. at Harvard University in 1952, and his Ph.D. at Harvard in 1955. His thesis, written under the direction of Oscar Zariski, was titled Local uniformization on algebraic surfaces over modular ground fields. Before going to Purdue, he was an associate professor of mathematics at Cornell University and Johns Hopkins University.

Abhyankar was appointed the Marshall Distinguished Professor of Mathematics at Purdue in 1967. His research topics include algebraic geometry (particularly resolution of singularities, a field in which he made significant progress over fields of finite characteristic), commutative algebra, local algebra, valuation theory, theory of functions of several complex variables, quantum electrodynamics, circuit theory, invariant theory, combinatorics, computer-aided design, and robotics. He popularized the Jacobian conjecture.

Death
Abhyankar died of a heart condition on 2 November 2012 at his residence near Purdue University.

Selected publications

Honours
Abhyankar has won numerous awards and honours.
 Abhyankar received the Herbert Newby McCoy Award from Purdue University in 1973 .
 Fellow of the Indian Academy of Sciences
 Editorial board member of the Indian Journal of Pure and Applied Mathematics
 Chauvenet Prize from the Mathematical Association of America (1978)
 Honorary Doctorate Degree (Docteur Honoris Causa) by the University of Angers in France (29 October 1998)
Fellow of the American Mathematical Society (2012)

See also

Abhyankar's conjecture
Abhyankar's inequality
Abhyankar's lemma
Abhyankar–Moh theorem

References

External links

 
 
 

People from Ujjain
1930 births
Indian emigrants to the United States
20th-century Indian mathematicians
20th-century American mathematicians
21st-century American mathematicians
2012 deaths
American people of Marathi descent
Algebraic geometers
Purdue University faculty
Harvard Graduate School of Arts and Sciences alumni
Fellows of the American Mathematical Society
Fellows of the Indian Academy of Sciences
American academics of Indian descent